The Championship of the Azerbaijan SSR in football was a top competition of association football in the Azerbaijan SSR in 1928-91.

List of champions

1928: Progress-2 Baku
1929–33: unknown
1934: Profsoyuz Baku
1935: Stroitel Yuga Baku
1936: Stroitel Yuga Baku
1937: Lokomotiv Baku
1938: Lokomotiv Baku
1939: Lokomotiv Baku
1940: Lokomotiv Baku
1941–43: unknown
1944: Dinamo Baku
1945: Neftyanik Baku
1946: Lokomotiv Baku
1947: Trudovye Rezervy Baku
1948: KKF Baku
1949: KKF Baku
1950: Iskra Baku
1951: Ordjonikidzeneft Baku
1952: Ordjonikidzeneft Baku
1953: Ordjonikidzeneft Baku
1954: Zavod im. S.M. Budennogo Baku
1955: Ordjonikidzeneft Baku
1956: NPU Ordgonikidzeneft Baku
1957: NPU Ordjonikidzeneft Baku
1958: NPU Ordjonikidzeneft Baku
1959: Baku Teams (Spartakiada)
1960: SKA Baku
1961: Spartak Guba
1962: SKA Baku
1963: Araz Baku
1964: Polad Sumgait
1965: Vostok Baku
1966: Vostok Baku
1967: Araz Baku
1968: SKA Baku
1969: Araz Baku
1970: SKA Baku
1971: Khimik Salyany
1972: Surahanets Baku
1973: Araz Baku
1974: Araz Baku
1975: Araz Baku
1976: Araz Baku
1977: Karabakh Khankendi
1978: SKIF Baku
1979: SKA Baku
1980: Energetik Ali-Bayramly
1981: Gandjlik Baku
1982: Tokhudju Baku
1983: Termist Baku
1984: Termist Baku
1985: Khazar Sumgayit
1986: Göyəzən
1987: Araz Naxçıvan
1988: Qarabağ Ağdam
1989: Stroitel Sabirabad
1990: Qarabağ Ağdam
1991: Khazar Sumgayit

See also
 Azerbaijan Premier League

References

External links
All Azerbaijani champions including Soviet at RSSSF

Azerbaijan
Football competitions in Azerbaijan
1928 establishments in Azerbaijan
1991 disestablishments in Azerbaijan
Recurring sporting events established in 1928
Recurring events disestablished in 1991
Azerbaijan Soviet Socialist Republic
Azerbaijan
Azerbaijan